The Pacific herring (Clupea pallasii) is a species of the herring family associated with the Pacific Ocean environment of North America and northeast Asia. It is a silvery fish with unspined fins and a deeply forked caudal fin. The distribution is widely along the California coast from Baja California north to Alaska and the Bering Sea; in Asia the distribution is south to Japan, Korea, and China. Clupea pallasii is considered a keystone species because of its very high productivity and interactions with many predators and prey. Pacific herring spawn in variable seasons, but often in the early part of the year in intertidal and sub-tidal environments, commonly on eelgrass, seaweed or other submerged vegetation; however, they do not die after spawning, but can breed in successive years. According to government sources, the Pacific herring fishery collapsed in the year 1993, and is slowly recovering to commercial viability in several North American stock areas. The species is named for Peter Simon Pallas, a noted German naturalist and explorer.

There are disjunct populations of Clupea pallasii in North-East Europe, which are often attributed to separate subspecies Clupea pallasii marisalbi (White Sea herring) and Clupea pallasii suworowi (Chosha herring).

Morphology
Pacific herring have a bluish-green back and silver-white sides and bellies; they are otherwise unmarked. The silvery color derives from guanine crystals embedded in their laterals, leading to an effective camouflage phenomenon. There is a single dorsal fin located mid-body and a deeply forked tail-fin. Their bodies are compressed laterally, and ventral scales protrude in a somewhat serrated fashion. Unlike other genus members, they have no scales on heads or gills; moreover, their scales are large and easy to extract. This species of fish may attain a length of 45 centimeters in exceptional cases and weigh up to 550 grams, but a typical adult size is closer to 33 centimeters. The fish interior is quite bony with oily flesh.

This species has no teeth on the jawline, but some are exhibited on the vomer. Pacific herring have an unusual retinal morphology that allows filter feeding in extremely dim lighting environments. This species is capable of rapid vertical motion, due to the existence of a complex nerve receptor system design that connects to the gas bladder.

Life cycle

Pacific herring prefer spawning locations in sheltered bays and estuaries. Along the American Pacific Coast, some of the principal areas are San Francisco Bay, Richardson Bay, Tomales Bay and Humboldt Bay. Adult males and females make their way from the open ocean to bays and coves around November or December, although in the far north of the range, these dates may be somewhat later. Conditions that trigger spawning are not altogether clear, but after spending weeks congregating in the deeper channels, both males and females will begin to enter shallower inter-tidal or sub-tidal waters. Submerged vegetation, especially eelgrass, is a preferred substrate for oviposition. A single female may lay as many as 20,000 eggs in one spawn following ventral contact with submerged substrates. However, the juvenile survival rate is only about one resultant adult per ten thousand eggs, due to high predation by numerous other species.

The precise staging of spawning is not understood, although some researchers suggest the male initiates the process by release of milt, which has a pheromone that stimulates the female to begin oviposition. The behavior seems to be collective so that an entire school may spawn in the period of a few hours, producing an egg density of up to 6,000,000 eggs per square meter. The fertilized spherical eggs, measuring 1.2 to 1.5 millimeters in diameter, incubate for approximately ten days in estuarine waters that are about 10 degrees Celsius. Eggs and juveniles are subject to heavy predation.

Fisheries

Historically the Pacific herring has been an important species, due to its productive abilities to generate significant species biomass. Biomass estimates have been performed by scuba divers from the Alaska Department of Fish and Game since 1975 but the estimates remain highly variable.

Herring has long been fished by First Nations on the Central Coast of British Columbia, and elsewhere. In 1997 the Supreme Court of Canada rendered its decision in the Gladstone decision (R. v. Gladstone)- recognizing a pre-existing aboriginal right to herring that includes a commercial component to the Heiltsuk Nation.

Due to overfishing, the total North American Pacific herring fishery collapsed in 1993, and is slowly recovering with active management by North American resource managers. In various sub-areas the Pacific herring fishery collapsed at slightly differing times;  for example, the Pacific herring fishery in Richardson Bay collapsed in 1983.  The species has been re-appearing in harvestable numbers in a number of North American fisheries including San Francisco Bay, Richardson Bay, Tomales Bay, Sitka Sound, Half Moon Bay and Humboldt Bay.  In other areas, such as Auke Bay, which, in the late 1970s was the largest harvestable stock of herring in Alaska, the species remains severely depleted.

Pacific herring are currently harvested commercially for bait and for roe.  Past commercial uses included fish oil and fish meal.

Conservation
On April 2, 2007, the Juneau group of the Sierra Club submitted a petition to list Pacific herring in the Lynn Canal, Alaska, area as a threatened or endangered distinct population segment under the criteria of the U.S. Endangered Species Act (ESA).  On April 11, 2008, that petition was denied because the Lynn Canal population was not found to qualify as a distinct population segment.  However, the National Marine Fisheries Service did announce would be initiating a status review for a wider Southeast Alaska distinct population segment of Pacific herring that includes the Lynn Canal population. The Southeast Alaska DPS of Pacific herring extends from Dixon Entrance northward to Cape Fairweather and Icy Point and includes all Pacific herring stocks in Southeast Alaska.

On February 5, 2018, researchers at Western Washington University began researching causes for the decline in Pacific herring populations in the Puget Sound; a prominent speculated reason is the loss of eelgrass, an important spawning substrate for the herring.

References

External links
 The Hakai Herring School website
 Alaska Fish and Game species writeup
 U.S. Fish and Wildlife Service species profile: Pacific herring
  Abundance, age, sex, and size statistics for Pacific herring in the Togiak district of Bristol Bay, 2004 by Chuck Brazil. Hosted by the Alaska State Publications Program.
 Kodiak management area herring sac roe fishery harvest strategy for the 2007 season / by Jeff Wadle, Geoff Spalinger, and Joe Dinnocenzo.  Hosted by the Alaska State Publications Program.

Fish of the Pacific Ocean
Fish of the Arctic Ocean
Clupeidae
Commercial fish
Fauna of the San Francisco Bay Area
Fish of Korea
Fish described in 1847
Taxa named by Achille Valenciennes